Events from the year 1146 in Ireland.

Incumbents
High King: Toirdelbach Ua Conchobair

Deaths
Ragnall mac Torcaill, King of Dublin slain.
Cellach Ua Cellaig, King of Brega slain.

References

 
1140s in Ireland
Ireland
Years of the 12th century in Ireland